The following is a list of female Anglican bishops in diocesan, suffragan, area, and assistant roles.

Primate Bishops
 Katharine Jefferts Schori (Episcopal Church, 2006-2015)
 Linda Nicholls (Anglican Church of Canada, 2019–present)

Metropolitans
Bishops or archbishops in charge of an internal ecclesiastical province but not being primates.
 Kay Goldsworthy (Archbishop of Perth, 2017–present)
 Lynne McNaughton (Archbishop of Kootenay and Metropolitan of the Ecclesiastical Province of British Columbia and Yukon, 2021–present)
 Anne Germond (Diocese of Algoma, Ecclesiastical Province of Ontario, 2018–present)

Diocesan bishops

Anglican Church of Canada

Ontario 

Anne Germond ((Arch)Bishop of Algoma, 2017–present)
 Susan Bell (Bishop of Niagara, 2018–present)

Rupert's Land 
 Victoria Matthews (Bishop of Edmonton, 1997-2007)
 Jane Alexander (Bishop of Edmonton, 2008–2021)

Canada 

Sue Moxley (Bishop of Nova Scotia and Prince Edward Island, 2007-2014)
 Mary Irwin-Gibson (Bishop of Montreal, 2015–present)

British Columbia and Yukon 

Melissa Skelton ((Arch)bishop of New Westminster, 2013–2021)
 Barbara Andrews, Suffragan to the Metropolitan, is effectively diocesan bishop of the Territory of the People

Anglican Church in Aotearoa, New Zealand and Polynesia
 Wai Quayle (Te Pīhopa o Te Upoko o Te Ika, 2019–present)
 Victoria Matthews (Bishop of Christchurch, 2008-2018)
 Helen-Ann Hartley (Bishop of Waikato, 2014–2018; co-equal diocesan)
 Penny Jamieson (Bishop of Dunedin, 1989-2004)

Anglican Church of Australia
 Kay Goldsworthy (Bishop of Gippsland, 2015-2017; Archbishop of Perth, 2017-present)
 Sarah Macneil (Bishop of Grafton, 2014-2018)

Anglican Episcopal Church of Brazil
 Marinez Santos Bassotto (Bishop of Amazon, 2018–present)

Episcopal Church of Cuba
 Griselda Delgado Del Carpio (Bishop of Cuba, 2010–present)

Church of England
Diocesan Bishops
 Rachel Treweek (Bishop of Gloucester, 2015–present)
 Christine Hardman (Bishop of Newcastle, 2015-2021)
 Sarah Mullally (Bishop of London, 2018–present)
 Viv Faull (Bishop of Bristol, 2018–present)
 Libby Lane (Bishop of Derby, 2019–present)
 Guli Francis-Dehqani (Bishop of Chelmsford, 2021–present)
Acting Diocesan Bishops
 Ruth Worsley (Acting Bishop of Bath and Wells, 2020–present)
 Debbie Sellin (Acting Bishop of Winchester, 2021–present)
 Karen Gorham (Acting Bishop of Salisbury, 2021–present)
De facto Diocesan Bishops
 Rose Hudson-Wilkin (Bishop of Dover, Bishop in Canterbury, 2019–present)

Church of Ireland
 Pat Storey (Bishop of Meath and Kildare, 2013–present)

Scottish Episcopal Church
 Anne Dyer (Bishop of Aberdeen and Orkney, 2018–present)

Church of South India
 Pushpa Lalitha (Bishop of Nandyal, 2013–present)

Anglican Church of Southern Africa
 Ellinah Wamukoya (Bishop of Swaziland, 2012-2021)
 Margaret Vertue (Bishop of False Bay, 2012–present)

Church in Wales
 Joanna Penberthy (Bishop of St David's, 2016 – present)
 June Osborne (Bishop of Llandaff, 2017–2022)
 Cherry Vann (Bishop of Monmouth, 2020–present)
 Mary Stallard (Bishop of Llandaff, 2023–present)

Episcopal Church (United States)

Province I
 Mary Adelia McLeod (Bishop of Vermont, 1993-2001)
 Geralyn Wolf (Bishop of Rhode Island, 1996-2012)
 Chilton R. Knudsen (Bishop of Maine, 1998-2008)
 Shannon MacVean-Brown (Bishop of Vermont, 2019–present)

Province II
 DeDe Duncan-Probe (Bishop of Central New York, 2016–present) 
 Carlye J. Hughes (Bishop of Newark, 2018–present)

Province III
 Mariann Budde (Bishop of Washington, 2011–present)
 Audrey Scanlan (Bishop of Central Pennsylvania, 2015–present) 
 Susan Bunton Haynes (Bishop of Southern Virginia, 2020–present)
 Ketlen A. Solak (Bishop of Pittsburgh, 2021–present)

Province IV
 Phoebe Alison Roaf (Bishop of West Tennessee, 2019–present)
 Glenda S. Curry (Bishop of Alabama, 2021–present)
 Ruth Woodliff-Stanley (Bishop of South Carolina, 2021–present)

Province V
 Catherine Waynick (Bishop of Indianapolis, 1997-2017)
 Jennifer Baskerville-Burrows (Bishop of Indianapolis, 2017–present)
 Bonnie Perry (Bishop of Michigan, 2020–present)

Province VI
 Kimberly Lucas (Bishop of Colorado, 2019–present)
 Martha Elizabeth Stebbins (Bishop of Montana, 2019–present)
 Betsey Monnot (Bishop of Iowa, 2021–present)

Province VII
 Cathleen Chittenden Bascom (Bishop of Kansas, 2019–present)

Province VIII
 Carolyn Tanner Irish (Bishop of Utah, 1996-2010)
 Mary Gray-Reeves (Bishop of El Camino Real, 2007-2020)
 Nedi Rivera (Provisional Bishop of Eastern Oregon, 2009-2015)
 Susan Brown Snook (Bishop of San Diego, 2019–present)
 Jennifer Anne Reddall (Bishop of Arizona, 2019–present)
 Megan M. Traquair (Bishop of Northern California, 2019–present)
 Lucinda Ashby (Bishop of El Camino Real, 2020–present)
 Diana Akiyama (Bishop of Oregon, 2021–present)
 Elizabeth Bonforte Gardner (Bishop of Nevada, 2022–present)

 Gretchen Rehberg (Bishop of Spokane, 2017-present)

Suffragan bishops

Anglican Church in Aotearoa, New Zealand and Polynesia
Eleanor Sanderson (Anglican Diocese of Wellington Assistant Bishop, 2017–present)

Anglican Church of Australia
 Kay Goldsworthy (Assistant Bishop, Anglican Diocese of Perth, 2008–2015)
 Barbara Darling (Assistant Bishop for Diocesan Ministries, Anglican Diocese of Melbourne, 2008-2009, Assistant Bishop (Eastern Region), Anglican Diocese of Melbourne, 2009-2015)
 Genieve Blackwell (Assistant Bishop, Anglican Diocese of Canberra and Goulburn, 2012-2015; Assistant Bishop (Marmingatha Episcopate), Anglican Diocese of Melbourne, 2015–present)
 Alison Taylor (Assistant Bishop (Southern Region), Anglican Diocese of Brisbane, 2013–2017)
 Kate Wilmot (Assistant Bishop, Anglican Diocese of Perth, 2015–present)
 Sonia Roulston (Assistant Bishop (Inland Episcopate), Anglican Diocese of Newcastle, 2018–present)
 Kate Prowd (Assistant Bishop (Oodthenong Episcopate), Anglican Diocese of Melbourne, 2018–present)
 Denise Ferguson (Assistant Bishop, Anglican Diocese of Adelaide, 2019–present)
 Carol Wagner (Assistant Bishop, Anglican Diocese of Canberra and Goulburn, 2020–present)

Anglican Church of Canada
 Victoria Matthews (Anglican Diocese of Toronto, 1993-1997)
 Ann Tottenham (Anglican Diocese of Toronto, 1997-2005)
 Sue Moxley (Anglican Diocese of Nova Scotia and Prince Edward Island, 2004-2007)
 Linda Nicholls (Anglican Diocese of Toronto, 2008-2016)
 Barbara Andrews (Bishop Suffragan to the Metropolitan {effectively, diocesan bishop} with responsibilities for the Territory of the People, 2009–present)
 Riscylla Walsh Shaw (Bishop of Trent-Durham, 2016–present)
 Jenny Andison (Bishop of York-Credit Valley, 2016–present)

Church of England

Canterbury Province
 Sarah Mullally (Bishop of Crediton in the Diocese of Exeter, 2015-2018)
 Anne Hollinghurst (Bishop of Aston in the Diocese of Birmingham, 2015–present)
 Ruth Worsley (Bishop of Taunton in the Diocese of Bath and Wells, 2015–present)
 Karen Gorham (Bishop of Sherborne in the Diocese of Salisbury, 2016–present)
 Jan McFarlane (Bishop of Repton in the Diocese of Derby, 2016-2020)
 Jo Bailey Wells (Bishop of Dorking in the Diocese of Guildford, 2016–present)
 Guli Francis-Dehqani (Bishop of Loughborough in the Diocese of Leicester, 2017-2021)
 Rose Hudson-Wilkin (see above, Bishop of Dover, de facto diocesan bishop of Canterbury, 2019–present)
 Sarah Bullock (Bishop of Shrewsbury in the Diocese of Lichfield, 2019–present)
 Dagmar Winter (Bishop of Huntingdon in the Diocese of Ely, 2019–present)
 Debbie Sellin (Bishop of Southampton in the Diocese of Winchester, 2019–present)
 Ruth Bushyager (Bishop of Horsham in the Diocese of Chichester, 2020–present)

York Province
 Libby Lane (Bishop of Stockport, in the Diocese of Chester, 2015-2019)
 Alison White (Bishop of Hull in the Diocese of York, 2015–present)
 Helen-Ann Hartley (Bishop of Ripon (Area bishop) in the Diocese of Leeds, 2018–present)
 Jillian Duff (Bishop of Lancaster in the Diocese of Blackburn, 2018–present)
 Sarah Clark (Bishop of Jarrow in the Diocese of Durham, 2018–present)
 Emma Ineson (Bishop of Penrith in the Diocese of Carlisle, 2019–present)

Province of the Episcopal Church of South Sudan
 Elizabeth Awut Ngor (Diocese of Rumbek, 2016–present)

Episcopal Church of Cuba
 Nerva Cot Aguilera (Diocese of Cuba, 2007-2010)

Episcopal Church (United States)

Province I
 Barbara Harris (Episcopal Diocese of Massachusetts, 1989-2003)
 Gayle Harris (Episcopal Diocese of Massachusetts, 2003–present)
 Laura J. Ahrens (Episcopal Diocese of Connecticut, 2007–present)

Province II
 Catherine S. Roskam (Episcopal Diocese of New York, 1996-2012)

Province III
 Jane Dixon (Episcopal Diocese of Washington, 1992-2002)
 Carol Joy W.T. Gallagher (Episcopal Diocese of Southern Virginia, 2002-2005)
 Susan Goff (Episcopal Diocese of Virginia, 2012–present)
 Heather Cook (Episcopal Diocese of Maryland, 2014-2015) 
 Jennifer Brooke-Davidson (Episcopal Diocese of Virginia, 2019–present)

Province IV
 Anne Hodges-Copple (Episcopal Diocese of North Carolina, 2013–present)

Province VII
 Dena Harrison (Episcopal Diocese of Texas, 2006-2019)
 Kathryn McCrossen Ryan (Episcopal Diocese of Texas, 2019–present)

Province VIII
 Mary Glasspool (Episcopal Diocese of Los Angeles, 2010-2016)
 Diane Jardine Bruce (Episcopal Diocese of Los Angeles, 2010–present)

Anglican Church of Kenya
 Emily Onyango (Diocese of Bondo, 2021–present)

References

Women Anglican clergy
Lists of Anglican bishops and archbishops
Lists of women by occupation